Kulgam Assembly constituency is one of the 87 constituencies in the Jammu and Kashmir Legislative Assembly of Jammu and Kashmir a north state of India. Kulgam is also part of Baramulla Lok Sabha constituency.

Member of Legislative Assembly

 1962: Mohammed Yaqub Bhat, Jammu & Kashmir National Conference
 1967: Mohammed Yaqub Bhat, Indian National Congress
 1972: Abdul Razak Mir, Jamait-I-Islami
 1977: Ghulam Nabi Dar, Jammu & Kashmir National Conference
 1983: Ghulam Nabi Dar, Jammu & Kashmir National Conference
 1987: Haji Abdul Pazak Mir, Independent
 1996: Mohammed Yousuf Tarigami, Communist Party of India (Marxist)
 2002: Mohammed Yousuf Tarigami, Communist Party of India (Marxist)
 2008: Mohammed Yousuf Tarigami, Communist Party of India (Marxist)

Election results

2014

See also
 Kulgam
 Kulgam district
 List of constituencies of Jammu and Kashmir Legislative Assembly

References

Assembly constituencies of Jammu and Kashmir
Kulgam district